Puskás Akadémia Football Club, commonly known as Puskás Akadémia, is a football club based in Felcsút, Hungary, that competes in the Nemzeti Bajnokság I, the top flight of Hungarian football.

Puskás Akadémia have spent five seasons in the Nemzeti Bajnokság I, the top flight of the Hungarian football league system, and reached the final of the 2017–18 Magyar Kupa season.

History
The aim of the founders was to establish an academy for Fehérvár FC and to establish a fitting memorial to former Hungarian national footballer Ferenc Puskás.

On the 30th matchday of the 2015–16 Nemzeti Bajnokság I season, Robert Jarni was dismissed due to the defeat against Békéscsaba 1912 Előre at the Pancho Aréna on 16 April 2016 resulting Puskás Akadémia's last position and relegation for the first time in history.

On 22 December 2016, Attila Pintér was appointed as the head coach of the club. Pintér left Mezőkövesdi SE, playing in the 2016–17 Nemzeti Bajnokság I season, for Puskás Akadémia.

On 21 May 2017, Puskás Akadémia won the 2016–17 Nemzeti Bajnokság II season after a goalless draw against Ceglédi VSE in Albertirsa. As a consequence, Puskás Akadémia got promoted to the 2017–18 Nemzeti Bajnokság I season. They could return to the first division after spending only one year in the second division.

On 12 June 2017, András Komjáti, previously manager of Vasas SC, was appointed as the club director.

Before the start of the 2017–18 Nemzeti Bajnokság I, Puskás Akadémia signed Molnár from Mezőkövesd, Radó from Ferencváros, thus becoming the third most valuable team in the 2017–18 season of the Nemzeti Bajnokság I.

On 4 June 2018, Pintér was sacked after finishing 6th in the 2017–18 Nemzeti Bajnokság I.

On 8 December 2018, after a 1–1 draw against Paksi FC Benczés was sacked due to the negative results. The club finished 9th before the winter break. Therefore, András Komjáti would be the interim manager on the last match day of the 2018–19 Nemzeti Bajnokság I.

On 29 December 2018, János Radoki, who was born in Mór, was appointed as the manager of the club. Radoki previously played 25 matches in the 1999–2000 Bundesliga in SSV Ulm as a player. He managed the U-17 team of FC Augsburg and the U-19 team of Greuther Fürth. On 7 April 2019, Radoki was replaced by András Komjáti after a shocking defeat (0–4) at home against Kisvárda FC.

The first match, against Budapest Honvéd FC at home, of the 2020-21 Nemzeti Bajnokság I season was postponed after one player of the club tested positive for COVID-19.

Puskás finished second in the 2020–21 Nemzeti Bajnokság I season. Therefore, they were eligible for playing in the 2021-22 UEFA Conference League season. In the first round, Puskás drew with FC Inter Turku and beat the Finnish team at home. However, in the second round Puskás were defeated both at home (0–2) and away (0-3) by the Latvian club FK RFS.

On 21 July 2022, Puskás lost 3-0 against Vitória S.C. in the first leg of the second round of the 2022–23 UEFA Europa Conference League at the Estádio D. Afonso Henriques in Guimarães, Portugal.

Honours
Nemzeti Bajnokság I: 
 Second place (1): 2020–21
 Third place (2): 2019–20, 2021–22
Nemzeti Bajnokság II:
  Winners (2): 2012–13, 2016–17
 Third place (1): 2010–11
Magyar Kupa:
 Runners-up (1): 2017–18

Youth teams
Puskás Cup:
  Winners (1): 2021
 Runners-up (4): 2008, 2012, 2014, 2016
 Third place (1): 2017

European record

As of match played 28 July 2022

Notes
 QR: Qualifying round

Players

Current squad

Out on loan

Reserve team
For the reserve squads, see Puskás Akadémia II

Seasons

Managers

See also
 Puskás Akadémia FC II

References

External links
 

 
Fehérvár FC
Football academies in Europe
2005 establishments in Hungary
UEFA Youth League teams
Association football clubs established in 2005